Out-of-Sync is a 1995 American crime drama film featuring LL Cool J in his first starring role. The film was directed by Debbie Allen and co-starred Victoria Dillard, Tim Reid and Howard Hesseman.

Plot
Jason St. Julian (LL Cool J), a talented yet troubled DJ with a gambling problem. As St. Julian is sleeping, Crash (Gene Anthony Ray) and Nut (Mark Venturini) break into his apartment to collect a debt, since St. Julian doesn't have the money, he gets a week to repay it. One night while DJing an underground party, St. Julian runs into Danny Simon (Ramy Zada) and his girlfriend Monica (Victoria Dillard), Simon tries to convince St. Julian to DJ at his club, but he refuses to do so because of Simon was responsible for sending St. Julian to jail.

Moments later, the party is broken up by the police and St. Julian is arrested for his part. While being interrogated, St. Julian meets Marcus Caldwell (Howard Hesseman), a crooked cop, who blackmails him into DJing for Simon. While at Simon's club, St. Julian begins to flirt with Monica, Simon sees this, he threatens Jason harm if he so much as breathes on her. St. Julian and Monica, now a couple devise a plan by stealing $400,000 from Simon by making it look like a robbery, While holding onto the money, St. Julian meets Monica at a motel, they celebrate by drinking champagne and throwing the money in the air and making love.

As St. Julian is sleeping, Monica takes the money and flies off to Cancun. Caldwell goes to St. Julian's room and berates him for letting Monica take the money as she went to the police and told what actually happened. Caldwell tells Jason to get the money back or else. As St. Julian tries to find Monica, Simon kills Monica's sister and while St. Julian goes to his apartment, Simon's goons follow him there, while getting info about Monica, Jason's friend Frank (Aries Spears) offers to go to Jason's apartment to get the "stash".

While in the apartment, Simon's goons returns there and finds Frank hiding. Frank is asked where St. Julian is but Frank refuses to say and he gets severely beaten and ends up in the hospital. St. Julian finds Monica in Cancun, he follows her to her hotel room and proceeds to take back the money while she's taking a shower. When she gets out, St. Julian stands before her holding the money, Monica pulls out her gun in an attempt to kill St. Julian, but he's taken the bullets out. Left with no other options, Monica throws herself at Julian but this does not work. St. Julian prepares to leave and he lets Monica know that Simon killed her sister.

As Simon and his associate Shorty proceed to head back to his office, They find St. Julian in there and demand why he's there. Shorty pulls out his gun but Jason reminds him that if he's killed, then he'll never know where his money is. While this discussion is going on, Caldwell comes in and he feels entitled to the money, apparently Caldwell has been paid a percentage of all the drugs that goes into the club but he wants a bigger cut. Later, a shootout takes place with Simon and Shorty being killed, Caldwell, wounded, forces Jason to walk back to the club at gunpoint. Being in the club, a video is played showing Caldwell killing Simon and Shorty and is promptly arrested.

During the last scene, Jason has paid off his debt and Crash and Nut tell him that the only reason they done what they did to him was "just business", Nut tells Jason that "playoffs are starting" but Jason declines the offer and Crash tells him to be careful as others are going to wonder where he got so much money. Nut and Jason have an exchange where Jason exacts revenge for all the pain Nut has caused him. While talking to Quincy (Yaphet Kotto), Jason tells him that he's going back to New York, Quincy tells him to be careful and wishes him well in the future. Jason drives to New York and that ends the movie.

Cast
LL Cool J as Jason St. Julian
Victoria Dillard as Monica Simmons
Tim Reid as Detective Wilson
Howard Hesseman as Detective Caldwell
Yaphet Kotto as Quincy
Luis Antonio Ramos as Ramon
Aries Spears as Frank
Don Yesso as Shorty
Carlo Imperato as Pauley
Gene Anthony Ray as Crash
Ramy Zada as Danny Simon
Debbie Allen as Manicurist
Mark Venturini as Nut

External links

1995 films
1995 crime drama films
1995 crime thriller films
Hood films
Films directed by Debbie Allen
Films scored by Guy Moon
American crime drama films
Artisan Entertainment films
1995 directorial debut films
1990s English-language films
1990s American films